Trevogrumab (INN; development code REGN1033) is a human monoclonal antibody designed for the treatment of muscle atrophy due to orthopedic disuse and sarcopenia.

This drug was developed by Regeneron Pharmaceuticals, Inc.

References 

Monoclonal antibodies